Park Town is a district of Luton, just south of the town centre, centred on Park Street, in the Luton district, in the ceremonial county of Bedfordshire, England. It is roughly bounded by Park Viaduct and Crawley Green Road to the north, New Airport Way to the South, the Midland Main Line to the East, and New Town Street and Seymour Road to the West. Park Town is one of the oldest suburbs of the now sprawling conurbation of Luton, the area first being built upon in the 19th century.

Politics 
Park Town is part of South ward, which is represented by Cllr David Agbley (Labour), Cllr Fatima Begum (Labour) and Cllr Javeria Hussain (Labour).

The ward forms part of the parliamentary constituency of Luton South and the MP is Rachel Hopkins (Labour).

References 

Areas of Luton